Feature-oriented software development (FOSD) is a general paradigm for software generation, where a model of a product line is a tuple of 0-ary and 1-ary functions (program transformations). This page discusses a more abstract concept of models of product lines of product lines (PL**2) called metamodels, and product lines of product lines of product lines called meta-metamodels (PL**3), and further abstract concepts.

Metamodels 
A metamodel is a model whose instances are models. A GenVoca model of a product line is a tuple whose components are features (0-ary or 1-ary functions).  An extension (a.k.a. delta or refinement) of a model is a "meta-feature", which is a tuple of deltas that can modify an existing product line by modifying existing features and adding new features. As a simple example, consider GenVoca model M that contains three features a-c: 

 

Suppose meta-model MM contains three meta-features AAA-CCC, each of which
is a tuple with a single non-identity feature:

 

where 0 is the null feature. Model M is constructed by adding the meta-features of MM, where + is the composition operation (see FOSD).

MM models a product line of product lines (PL**2). That is, different MM expressions correspond to GenVoca models of different product lines..

See also 
 Feature-oriented programming – basic overview
 FOSD origami
 FOSD program cubes – multi-dimensional product lines
 FOSD feature interactions – other operations on features, including an operation designating feature interaction

References 

Feature-oriented programming